Dhokla is a savoury sponge dish that is native to the Indian state of Gujarat and parts of adjacent states, and is popular throughout the country. It is made with a fermented batter that is steamed to a cake-like consistency. The batter consists of a mixture of rice with the pulse Bengal gram, but has several variants with the gram replaced by chickpeas, pigeon peas, or urad beans.

History 
Dukkia, a pulse-based precursor of dhokla, is mentioned in a Jain text dated to 1066 CE. The earliest extant work to mention the word "dhokla" is the Gujarati Varanaka Samuchaya (1520 CE).

Preparation
Dried rice and split chickpeas (chana dal) are soaked overnight. The mixture is ground, and the paste is fermented for at least four hours. Spices are added, such as chili pepper, coriander, and ginger.

The fermented batter is then steamed for about 15 minutes and cut into pieces. These chopped pieces are seasoned in hot oil with mustard seeds or cumin seeds.

Dhokla is usually served with deep fried chillies and coriander chutney and garnished with fresh coriander and/or grated coconut.

Types of Dhokla

Popular variants of dhokla include:
 Khatta dhokla
 Rasia dhokla
 Moong dal dhokla
Khandavi dhokla
 Cheese dhokla
Toor dal dhokla
Sandwich dhokla
Rava dhokla
 Mixed dal dhokla
Green peas dhokla
 Meetha dhokla
Besan dhokla

Khaman is similar but made from chickpea flour without rice. It is generally lighter in colour and softer than dhokla.

See also

 List of fermented foods
 List of steamed foods
 Khandvi

References

Gujarati cuisine
Indian snack foods
Indian fast food
Fermented foods
Chickpea dishes
Vegetarian dishes of India
Steamed foods